Bollklubben-46 (abbreviated BK-46) is a sports club from Karis, Raseborg in Finland.  The club was formed in 1946 and the main activities covered are football and handball with large junior sections in both disciplines.  BK-46 men's first team currently plays in the Kakkonen (Second Division), the third level of football in Finland.  Their home ground is at the Karis sportplan.  The Chairman of the club is Leif Österholm.

History
BK-46 was founded in 1946 and from the outset specialised in the sports of football and handball.  The club has been more successful at handball and the men's team have won the SM Championship 20 times and the women's SM championship once.

The club has not always been successful and in 1974 ceased operations completely as the result of a poor economic situation.  When the organisation was re-launched it was as two separate sections for football and handball.

BK-46 most successful period for football was in the late 1950s and the 1960s when they spent 4 seasons in the Suomensarjaa (Finland League), which at that time was the second tier of Finnish football, in 1957, 1961 and 1968–69.
There then followed many barren years in the lower divisions until 2009 when the club won Section 1 of the Kolmonen (Helsinki and Uusimaa). The year 2010 is the club's first season in the Kakkonen (Second Division), the third tier of Finnish football.

Season to season

Club Structure
BK-46 run a number of teams including 2 men's teams, 8 boys teams and 1 girls team.

2010 season
 BK-46  are competing in Group B (Lohko B) of the Kakkonen administered by the Football Association of Finland  (Suomen Palloliitto) .  This is the third highest tier in the Finnish football system.  In 2009 Bollklubben-46 finished in first position in Section 1 of the Kolmonen and were promoted to the Kakkonen.

 BK-46 NK02 are participating in Section 1 (Lohko 1) of the Vitonen administered by the Uusimaa SPL.

References

Sources
 Official Football Website
BK-46 NK02 Website
Official Handball Website
Finnish Wikipedia
BK-46 Fotboll (Unofficial) Facebook

Football clubs in Finland
Organisations based in Raseborg
1946 establishments in Finland